Sugar is the eleventh studio album by Japanese band Tokio. It was released on February 20, 2008. The album peaked at sixth place on the Oricon weekly charts and charted for six weeks.

Track listing

References 

2008 albums
Tokio (band) albums